Afrin Ali née Aparupa Poddar (born 8 January 1986) is an Indian politician and a member of parliament to the 16th 17th Lok Sabha from Arambagh (Lok Sabha constituency), West Bengal. She won the 2014 & 2019 Indian general election as an All India Trinamool Congress candidate.

Controversies
The allegations relating to the first controversy, regarding financial corruption, were confirmed to be true on 05-Oct-2017, when she confessed that she had taken a bribe from Narada News boss Mathew Samuel as part of Narada sting operation.

The allegations regarding the second controversy are regarding her religion. Born into a Hindu family and named Aparupa Poddar at birth, she married a Muslim man. She then stood for election from a parliamentary constituency which is reserved for those belonging to the scheduled castes. The Bharatiya Janata Party lodged a complaint with the Election Commission seeking cancellation of her candidature on the plea that she had converted to Islam and hence she did not belong to a scheduled caste. Aparupa Poddar then claimed, that she had changed her name but not her religion.

References

External links

Living people
1986 births
Lok Sabha members from West Bengal
Women in West Bengal politics
Women members of the Lok Sabha
21st-century Indian Muslims
Trinamool Congress politicians from West Bengal
People from Hooghly district
Hooghly Mohsin College alumni
India MPs 2014–2019
India MPs 2019–present
21st-century Indian politicians
21st-century Indian women politicians